Jerome H. Barkow is a Canadian anthropologist at Dalhousie University who has made important contributions to the field of evolutionary psychology. He received a BA in Psychology from Brooklyn College in 1964 and a PhD in Human Development from the University of Chicago in 1970. He is Professor of Social Anthropology at Dalhousie University and a Distinguished International Fellow at the Institute of Cognition and Culture, Queen's University Belfast (Northern Ireland). He also serves on the Board of Directors of METI (Messaging Extraterrestrial Intelligence).

Barkow has published on topics ranging from sex workers in Nigeria to the kinds of sentients SETI might find. He is best known as the author of Darwin, Sex, and Status: Biological Approaches to Mind and Culture (1989). In 1992, together with Leda Cosmides and John Tooby, Barkow edited the influential book The Adapted Mind: Evolutionary Psychology and the Generation of Culture. In 2006, he edited Missing the Revolution: Darwinism for Social Scientists.

See also 
 Human behavioral ecology

Year of birth missing (living people)
Living people
Brooklyn College alumni
Human Behavior and Evolution Society
University of Chicago alumni
Canadian anthropologists
Academic staff of the Dalhousie University
Evolutionary psychologists